Tezerj (also Romanized as Tez̄erj; also known as Tejerk) is a village in Jorjafak Rural District, in the Central District of Zarand County, Kerman Province, Iran. At the 2006 census, its population was 69, in 16 families.

References 

Populated places in Zarand County